Benno Landsberger (21 April 1890 – 26 April 1968) was a German Assyriologist.

Early life and education 
He was born on 21 April 1890 in Friedek, then part of Austrian Silesia, and from 1908 studied Oriental Studies at Leipzig. Amongst his teachers were August Fischer in Arabic and Heinrich Zimmern in Assyriology. In 1914 Landsberger joined the Austro-Hungarian Army, where he fought with distinction on the Eastern Front, winning a golden Distinguished Service Cross. He returned to Leipzig after the war and was appointed to the position of 'extraordinary professor" in 1926. In 1928 he was appointed successor to Peter Jensen at Marburg, but returned to Leipzig in 1929 as Zimmern's successor.

Later career 
Landsberger was dismissed as a result of the Nazi-era Law for the Restoration of the Professional Civil Service which excluded Jews from government employment. Landsberger accepted a post at the new Turkish University of Ankara, working especially in the area of languages, history and geography. After 1945 he was appointed to the Oriental Institute of the University of Chicago, where he worked until 1955. During this period he became a naturalized American citizen. He was elected to the American Philosophical Society in 1959.

Landsberger was an eminent and groundbreaking scholar, editing many important lexical texts and conducting fundamental linguistic studies. He passed on a Germanic academic tradition that continues today in many countries via his students. He was also known for particularly black humor and a love of cigars and beer.

Works 
 The ritual calendar of Babylonia and Assyria Leipzig 1914 (thesis) Leipzig Semitic Studies Bd 6, H, 1 February 1915
 "Der 'Ventiv' des Akkadischen" Zeitschrift für Assyriologie 35: 113–23 1924
 Über die Völker Vorderasiens im dritten Jahrtausend Zeitschrift für Assyriologie 35: 213–44 1924
 Assyrische Handelskolonien in Kleinasien aus dem dritten Jahrtausend (Assyrian Commercial Colonies in Asia Minor from the Third Millennium) Leipzig 1925 (Der Alte Orient, Bd. 24. H. 4)
 Materialen zum sumerischen Lexikon (Materials for the Sumerian Lexicon, ed. with others) Rome 1937-
 The Assyrian Dictionary of the Oriental Institute of the University of Chicago (ed. with others) Chicago 1956-

References 

 https://www.deutsche-biographie.de/gnd116681888.html#ndbcontent

1890 births
1968 deaths
Jewish emigrants from Nazi Germany
20th-century Austrian people
German Assyriologists
Austrian Assyriologists
Jewish orientalists
Silesian Jews
American people of Czech-Jewish descent
German expatriates in Turkey
German emigrants to the United States
People from Frýdek-Místek
German male non-fiction writers
Corresponding Fellows of the British Academy
Austro-Hungarian Army officers

Members of the American Philosophical Society